Dylan D. Olsen (born January 3, 1991) is an American professional ice hockey player, who is currently an unrestricted free agent. He most recently played with the Wichita Thunder of the ECHL. Olsen played for the Florida Panthers of the National Hockey League (NHL). Olsen was drafted 28th overall by the Chicago Blackhawks during the 2009 NHL Entry Draft. He played his junior hockey with the Camrose Kodiaks of the Alberta Junior Hockey League (AJHL), and played college ice hockey at the University of Minnesota Duluth of the NCAA.

Playing career

Amateur
Olsen, who was drafted by the Medicine Hat Tigers of the Western Hockey League (WHL) in the fourth round, 84th overall in the 2006 WHL Bantam Draft, elected to play with the Camrose Kodiaks of the AJHL to keep his NCAA eligibility. Olsen appeared in two games with the Kodiaks in 2006–07, scoring a goal.

In his rookie season of 2007–08, Olsen appeared in 49 games, scoring eight goals and 24 points, as he helped the Kodiaks to have the best record in the league. In the playoffs, Olsen had six points in 16 games, as Camrose won the 2008 AJHL championship. The club then won the 2008 Doyle Cup as Western Canadian champions, defeating the Penticton Vees, before falling to the Humboldt Broncos in the final game of the 2008 Royal Bank Cup.

In 2008–09, Olsen improved his numbers, scoring 10 goals and 29 points in 53 games, and in ten playoff games, he earned seven points before the Kodiaks were eliminated in the AJHL playoffs.

Olsen spent the 2009–10 season with the University of Minnesota Duluth Bulldogs, where in 36 games, Olsen had a goal and 11 points, along with 49 penalty minutes.

Professional
Olsen signed a three-year entry level contract with the Chicago Blackhawks on December 31, 2010, while playing for Team Canada at the 2011 World Junior Ice Hockey Championships. After the conclusion of the tournament Olsen reported to Rockford, the Blackhawks top minor league affiliate.

Olsen participated in his first playoff game on Tuesday, April 17, 2012, in Game Three of the Western Conference Quarterfinals.

During the 2013–14 season, on November 14, 2013, Olsen was traded by the Blackhawks to the Florida Panthers along with Jimmy Hayes in exchange for Kris Versteeg and Philippe Lefebvre. Olsen scored his first NHL goal as a member of the Panthers on December 5, 2013 against Ondrej Pavelec of the Winnipeg Jets.

Following the 2015–16 season, Olsen was released as a free agent by the Panthers, and went un-signed throughout the following 2016–17 season. After playing locally with the Nanton Palominos of the Ranchland Hockey League, Olsen accepted a try-out in the following summer to attend the Calgary Flames training camp on September 13, 2017. At the conclusion of camp in Calgary, Olsen was assigned to tryout with AHL affiliate, the Stockton Heat, on September 19, 2017. On October 13, Olsen signed a one-year deal with the ECHL's Adirondack Thunder.

After playing 8 seasons in North America, Olsen opted to sign abroad in agreeing to a one-year deal with English club the Nottingham Panthers of the Elite Ice Hockey League (EIHL) on May 31, 2018.

Olsen played parts of two seasons abroad with the Panthers and Slovakian club, HK Nitra of the Slovak Extraliga, before returning to North America during the 2019–20 season, continuing his professional career in the ECHL with the South Carolina Stingrays on January 10, 2020.

Personal life
Olsen's father, Darryl Olsen, played in one game with the Calgary Flames during the 1991–92 NHL season, and spent some of his years in the minor leagues in Salt Lake City, Utah, where Dylan was born.

Career statistics

Regular season and playoffs

International

Awards and honors
Invited to take part in Canada's 2011 National Junior Team selection camp

References

External links

Dylan Olsen player profile on the Alberta Junior Hockey League site

1991 births
Adirondack Thunder players
American men's ice hockey defensemen
Binghamton Devils players
Camrose Kodiaks players
Chicago Blackhawks draft picks
Chicago Blackhawks players
Florida Panthers players
Ice hockey people from Utah
Living people
Minnesota Duluth Bulldogs men's ice hockey players
National Hockey League first-round draft picks
HK Nitra players
Nottingham Panthers players
Portland Pirates players
Rockford IceHogs (AHL) players
San Antonio Rampage players
South Carolina Stingrays players
Sportspeople from Salt Lake City
Wichita Thunder players
Canadian ice hockey defencemen
American expatriate ice hockey players in England
Canadian expatriate ice hockey players in England
American expatriate ice hockey players in Slovakia
Canadian expatriate ice hockey players in Slovakia